The Hammersley–Clifford theorem is a result in probability theory, mathematical statistics and statistical mechanics that gives necessary and sufficient conditions under which a strictly positive probability distribution (of events in a probability space)  can be represented as events generated by a Markov network (also known as a Markov random field). It is the fundamental theorem of random fields. It states that a probability distribution that has a strictly positive mass or density satisfies one of the Markov properties with respect to an undirected graph G if and only if it is a Gibbs random field, that is, its density can be factorized over the cliques (or complete subgraphs) of the graph.

The relationship between Markov and Gibbs random fields was initiated by Roland Dobrushin and Frank Spitzer in the context of statistical mechanics. The theorem is named after John Hammersley and Peter Clifford, who proved the equivalence in an unpublished paper in 1971. Simpler proofs using the inclusion–exclusion principle were given independently by Geoffrey Grimmett, Preston and Sherman in 1973, with a further proof by Julian Besag in 1974.

Proof outline

It is a trivial matter to show that a Gibbs random field satisfies every Markov property. As an example of this fact, see the following:

In the image to the right, a Gibbs random field over the provided graph has the form .

This implies that .

To establish that every positive probability distribution that satisfies the local Markov property is also a Gibbs random field, the following lemma, which provides a means for combining different factorizations, needs to be proved:

Lemma 1

Let  denote the set of all random variables under consideration, and let  and  denote arbitrary sets of variables.

If

In order to use  as a template to further factorize , all variables outside of  need to be fixed.

To do this, the factorization 

 

will be re-expressed as

Let 

and 

for each  so

Since ,
 

Letting 

gives:

which finally gives:

The local Markov property implies that for any random variable , that there exists factors  and  such that:

where  are the neighbors of node . Applying Lemma 1 repeatedly eventually factors  into a product of clique potentials (see the image on the right).

End of Proof

See also
 Markov random field
 Conditional random field

Notes

Further reading
 , course notes from University of Washington course.
 
 

Probability theorems
Theorems in statistics
Markov networks